Hedy Lamarr (born Hedwig Eva Maria Kiesler; November 9, 1914 January 19, 2000) was an Austrian-born American film actress and inventor. A film star during Hollywood's golden age, Lamarr has been described as one of the greatest movie actresses of all time.  

After a brief early film career in Czechoslovakia, including the controversial Ecstasy (1933), she fled from her first husband, a wealthy Austrian ammunition manufacturer, and secretly moved to Paris. Traveling to London, she met Metro-Goldwyn-Mayer studio head Louis B. Mayer, who offered her a movie contract in Hollywood. She became a film star with her performance in Algiers (1938). Her MGM films include Lady of the Tropics (1939), Boom Town (1940), H.M. Pulham, Esq. (1941), and White Cargo (1942). Her greatest success was as Delilah in Cecil B. DeMille's Bible-inspired Samson and Delilah (1949). She also acted on television before the release of her final film, The Female Animal (1958). She was honored with a star on the Hollywood Walk of Fame in 1960.

At the beginning of World War II, she and avant-garde composer George Antheil developed a radio guidance system for Allied torpedoes that used spread spectrum and frequency hopping technology to defeat the threat of jamming by the Axis powers.

Early life
Lamarr was born Hedwig Eva Maria Kiesler in 1914 in Vienna, the only child of Gertrud "Trude" Kiesler (née Lichtwitz) and Emil Kiesler.

Her father, Emil, was born to a Galician-Jewish family in Lemberg in the Austrian part of the Austro-Hungarian Empire (now Lviv in Ukraine) and was, in the 1920s, deputy director of Wiener Bankverein, and in the end of his life a director at the united Creditanstalt-Bankverein. Trude, her mother, a pianist and Budapest native, had come from an upper-class Hungarian-Jewish family. She had converted to Catholicism and was described as a "practicing Christian" who raised her daughter as a Christian, although Hedy was not formally baptized at the time.

As a child, Lamarr showed an interest in acting and was fascinated by theatre and film. At the age of 12, she won a beauty contest in Vienna. She also began to associate invention with her father, who would take her out on walks, explaining how technology functioned.

European film career

Early work
Lamarr was taking acting classes in Vienna when one day, she forged a note from her mother and went to Sascha-Film and was able to get herself hired as a script girl. While there, she was able to get a role as an extra in Money on the Street (1930), and then a small speaking part in Storm in a Water Glass (1931). Producer Max Reinhardt then cast her in a play entitled The Weaker Sex, which was performed at the Theater in der Josefstadt. Reinhardt was so impressed with her that he brought her with him back to Berlin.

However, she never actually trained with Reinhardt or appeared in any of his Berlin productions. Instead, she met the Russian theatre producer Alexis Granowsky, who cast her in his film directorial debut, The Trunks of Mr. O.F. (1931), starring Walter Abel and Peter Lorre. Granowsky soon moved to Paris, but Lamarr stayed in Berlin and was given the lead role in No Money Needed (1932), a comedy directed by Carl Boese. Lamarr then starred in the film which made her internationally famous.

Ecstasy

In early 1933, at age 18, Lamarr was given the lead in Gustav Machatý's film Ecstasy (Ekstase in German, Extase in Czech). She played the neglected young wife of an indifferent older man.

The film became both celebrated and notorious for showing Lamarr's face in the throes of orgasm as well as close-up and brief nude scenes. Lamarr claimed she was "duped" by the director and producer, who used high-power telephoto lenses, but other people related to the movie contested her claims.

Although she was dismayed and now disillusioned about taking other roles, the film gained world recognition after winning an award at the Venice Film Festival. Throughout Europe, it was regarded an artistic work. In America it was considered overly sexual and received negative publicity, especially among women's groups. It was banned there and in Germany.

Withdrawal
Lamarr played a number of stage roles, including a starring one in Sissy, a play about Empress Elisabeth of Austria produced in Vienna. It won accolades from critics. Admirers sent roses to her dressing room and tried to get backstage to meet her. She sent most of them away, including a man who was more insistent, Friedrich Mandl. He became obsessed with getting to know her.

Mandl was an Austrian military arms merchant and munitions manufacturer who was reputedly the third-richest man in Austria. She fell for his charming and fascinating personality, partly due to his immense financial wealth. Her parents, both of Jewish descent, did not approve, due to Mandl's ties to Italian fascist leader Benito Mussolini, and later, German Führer Adolf Hitler, but they could not stop the headstrong Lamarr.

On August 10, 1933, Lamarr married Mandl at the Karlskirche. She was 18 years old and he was 33. In her alleged autobiography Ecstasy and Me, she described Mandl as an extremely controlling husband who strongly objected to her simulated orgasm scene in Ecstasy and prevented her from pursuing her acting career. She claimed she was kept a virtual prisoner in their castle home, Schloss Schwarzenau.

Mandl had close social and business ties to the Italian government, selling munitions to the country, and although like Hedy, his own father was Jewish, had ties to the Nazi regime of Germany, as well. Lamarr wrote that the dictators of both countries attended lavish parties at the Mandl home. Lamarr accompanied Mandl to business meetings, where he conferred with scientists and other professionals involved in military technology. These conferences were her introduction to the field of applied science and nurtured her latent talent in science.

Lamarr's marriage to Mandl eventually became unbearable, and she decided to separate herself from both her husband and country in 1937. In her alleged autobiography, she wrote that she disguised herself as her maid and fled to Paris, but by other accounts, she persuaded Mandl to let her wear all of her jewelry for a dinner party, then disappeared afterward. She writes about her marriage:

Hollywood career

Louis B. Mayer and MGM

After arriving in London in 1937, she met Louis B. Mayer, head of MGM, who was scouting for talent in Europe. She initially turned down the offer he made her (of $125 a week), but then booked herself onto the same New York bound liner as him, and managed to impress him enough to secure a $500 a week contract. Mayer persuaded her to change her name to Hedy Lamarr (to distance herself from her real identity, and "the Ecstasy lady" reputation associated with it), choosing the surname in homage to the beautiful silent film star, Barbara La Marr, on the suggestion of his wife, who admired La Marr. He brought her to Hollywood in 1938 and began promoting her as the "world's most beautiful woman".

Mayer loaned Lamarr to producer Walter Wanger, who was making Algiers (1938), an American version of the French film, Pépé le Moko (1937). Lamarr was cast in the lead opposite Charles Boyer. The film created a "national sensation", says Shearer. She was billed as an unknown but well-publicized Austrian actress, which created anticipation in audiences. Mayer hoped she would become another Greta Garbo or Marlene Dietrich. According to one viewer, when her face first appeared on the screen, "everyone gasped ... Lamarr's beauty literally took one's breath away."

In future Hollywood films, she was invariably typecast as the archetypal glamorous seductress of exotic origin.  Her second American film was to be I Take This Woman, co-starring with Spencer Tracy under the direction of regular Dietrich collaborator Josef von Sternberg. Von Sternberg was fired during the shoot, replaced by Frank Borzage. The film was put on hold, and Lamarr was put into Lady of the Tropics (1939), where she played a mixed-race seductress in Saigon opposite Robert Taylor. She returned to I Take This Woman, re-shot by W. S. Van Dyke. The resulting film was a flop.

Far more popular was Boom Town (1940) with Clark Gable, Claudette Colbert and Spencer Tracy; it made $5 million. MGM promptly reteamed Lamarr and Gable in Comrade X (1940), a comedy film in the vein of Ninotchka (1939), which was another hit.

Lamarr was teamed with James Stewart in Come Live with Me (1941), playing a Viennese refugee. Stewart was also in Ziegfeld Girl (1941), where Lamarr, Judy Garland and Lana Turner played aspiring showgirls - a big success.

Lamarr was top-billed in H. M. Pulham, Esq. (1941), although the film's protagonist was the title role played by Robert Young. She made a third film with Tracy, Tortilla Flat (1942). It was successful at the box office, as was Crossroads (1942) with William Powell.

Lamarr played the exotic Arab seductress Tondelayo in White Cargo (1942), top billed over Walter Pidgeon. It was a huge hit. White Cargo contains arguably her most memorable film quote, delivered with provocative invitation: "I am Tondelayo. I make tiffin for you?" This line typifies many of Lamarr's roles, which emphasized her beauty and sensuality while giving her relatively few lines. The lack of acting challenges bored Lamarr. She reportedly took up inventing to relieve her boredom.

She was reunited with Powell in a comedy The Heavenly Body (1944), then was borrowed by Warner Bros for The Conspirators (1944). This was an attempt to repeat the success of Casablanca (1943), and RKO borrowed her for a melodrama Experiment Perilous (1944).

Back at MGM Lamarr was teamed with Robert Walker in the romantic comedy Her Highness and the Bellboy (1945), playing a princess who falls in love with a New Yorker. It was very popular, but would be the last film she made under her MGM contract.

Her off-screen life and personality during those years was quite different from her screen image. She spent much of her time feeling lonely and homesick. She might swim at her agent's pool, but shunned the beaches and staring crowds. When asked for an autograph, she wondered why anyone would want it. Writer Howard Sharpe interviewed her and gave his impression:

Author Richard Rhodes describes her assimilation into American culture:

Lamarr also had a penchant for speaking about herself in the third person.

Wartime fundraiser
Lamarr wanted to join the National Inventors Council, but was reportedly told by NIC member Charles F. Kettering and others that she could better help the war effort by using her celebrity status to sell war bonds.

She participated in a war bond-selling campaign with a sailor named Eddie Rhodes. Rhodes was in the crowd at each Lamarr appearance, and she would call him up on stage. She would briefly flirt with him before asking the audience if she should give him a kiss. The crowd would say yes, to which Hedy would reply that she would if enough people bought war bonds. After enough bonds were purchased, she would kiss Rhodes and he would head back into the audience. Then they would head off to the next war bond rally.

Producer

After leaving MGM in 1945, Lamarr formed a production company with Jack Chertok and made the thriller The Strange Woman (1946). It went over budget and only made minor profits.

She and Chertok then made Dishonored Lady (1947), another thriller starring Lamarr, which also went over budget - but was not a commercial success. She tried a comedy with Robert Cummings, Let's Live a Little (1948).

Later films
Lamarr enjoyed her biggest success playing Delilah against Victor Mature as the Biblical strongman in Cecil B. DeMille's Samson and Delilah, the highest-grossing film of 1950. The film also won two Oscars.

Lamarr returned to MGM for a film noir with John Hodiak, A Lady Without Passport (1950), which flopped. More popular were two pictures she made at Paramount, a Western with Ray Milland, Copper Canyon (1950), and a Bob Hope spy spoof, My Favorite Spy (1951).

Her career went into decline. She went to Italy to play multiple roles in Loves of Three Queens (1954), which she also produced. However she lacked the experience necessary to make a success of such an epic production, and lost millions of dollars when she was unable to secure distribution of the picture.

She was Joan of Arc in Irwin Allen's critically panned epic, The Story of Mankind (1957) and did episodes of Zane Grey Theatre ("Proud Woman") and Shower of Stars ("Cloak and Dagger"). Her last film was a thriller The Female Animal (1958).

Lamarr was signed to act in the 1966 film Picture Mommy Dead, but was let go when she collapsed during filming from nervous exhaustion. She was replaced in the role of Jessica Flagmore Shelley by Zsa Zsa Gabor.

Inventor

Although Lamarr had no formal training and was primarily self-taught, she tinkered in her spare time on various hobbies and ideas, which included a traffic stoplight and a tablet that would dissolve in water to create a carbonated drink. The beverage was unsuccessful; Lamarr herself said it tasted like Alka-Seltzer.

During World War II, Lamarr read that radio-controlled torpedoes had been proposed. However, an enemy might be able to jam such a torpedo's guidance system and set it off course. When discussing this with her friend the composer and pianist George Antheil, the idea was raised that a frequency-hopping signal might prevent the torpedo's radio guidance system from being tracked or jammed. Antheil succeeded by synchronizing a miniaturized player piano mechanism with radio signals. Antheil sketched out the idea for the frequency-hopping system, which was to use a perforated paper tape which actuated pneumatic controls (as was already used in player pianos).

Antheil was introduced to Samuel Stuart Mackeown, a professor of radio-electrical engineering at Caltech, whom Lamarr then employed for a year to actually implement the idea.
In 1997, Lamarr and Antheil received the Electronic Frontier Foundation Pioneer Award and the Bulbie Gnass Spirit of Achievement Bronze Award, given to individuals whose creative lifetime achievements in the arts, sciences, business, or invention fields have significantly contributed to society. In 2014, Lamarr and Antheil were posthumously inducted into the National Inventors Hall of Fame.

Neither the US Navy nor that of any other nation were using radio-controlled torpedoes at the time, and electro-mechanical devices were soon to be made obsolete by purely electronic controls. Furthermore, spread-spectrum frequency-hopping was not a completely new idea: as early as 1899, Guglielmo Marconi had experimented with frequency-selective reception in an attempt to minimize radio interference, Nikola Tesla had written extensively about it in the first quarter of the 20th century, in 1929 the Polish engineer and inventor Leonard Danilewicz further elaborated on the idea, and in 1932  was issued to the Dutch inventor, William Broertjes for his electromechanical device to encrypt radio transmissions by using frequency-hopping.

Although the U.S. Navy did not adopt the technology until the 1960s, the principles of their work are incorporated into Bluetooth and GPS technology and are similar to methods used in legacy versions of CDMA and Wi-Fi. This work led to their induction into the National Inventors Hall of Fame in 2014.

Later years
Lamarr became a naturalized citizen of the United States at age 38 on April 10, 1953. Her alleged autobiography, Ecstasy and Me, was published in 1966. She said on TV that it was not written by her, and much of it was fictional. Lamarr later sued the publisher, saying that many details were fabricated by its ghost writer, Leo Guild. Lamarr, in turn, was sued by Gene Ringgold, who asserted that the book plagiarized material from an article he had written in 1965 for Screen Facts magazine.

In the late 1950s Lamarr designed and, with then-husband W. Howard Lee, developed the Villa LaMarr ski resort in Aspen, Colorado.

In 1966, Lamarr was arrested in Los Angeles for shoplifting. The charges were eventually dropped. In 1991, she was arrested on the same charge in Florida, this time for stealing $21.48 worth of laxatives and eye drops. She pleaded no contest to avoid a court appearance, and the charges were dropped in return for her promise to refrain from breaking any laws for a year.

The 1970s was a decade of increasing seclusion for Lamarr. She was offered several scripts, television commercials, and stage projects, but none piqued her interest. In 1974, she filed a $10 million lawsuit against Warner Bros., claiming that the running parody of her name ("Hedley Lamarr") in the Mel Brooks comedy Blazing Saddles infringed her right to privacy. Brooks said he was flattered; the studio settled out of court for an undisclosed nominal sum and an apology to Lamarr for "almost using her name". Brooks said that Lamarr "never got the joke". With her eyesight failing, Lamarr retreated from public life and settled in Miami Beach, Florida, in 1981.

A large Corel-drawn image of Lamarr won CorelDRAW's yearly software suite cover design contest in 1996. For several years, beginning in 1997, it was featured on boxes of the software suite. Lamarr sued the company for using her image without her permission. Corel countered that she did not own rights to the image. The parties reached an undisclosed settlement in 1998.

For her contribution to the motion picture industry, Lamarr has a star on the Hollywood Walk of Fame at 6247 Hollywood Blvd adjacent to Vine Street where the walk is centered.

Lamarr became estranged from her older son, James Lamarr Loder, when he was 12 years old. Their relationship ended abruptly, and he moved in with another family. They did not speak again for almost 50 years. Lamarr left James Loder out of her will, and he sued for control of the US$3.3 million estate left by Lamarr in 2000. He eventually settled for US$50,000.

Seclusion
In the last decades of her life, the telephone became Lamarr's only means of communication with the outside world, even with her children and close friends. She often talked up to six or seven hours a day on the phone, but she spent hardly any time with anyone in person in her final years.

Death

Lamarr died in Casselberry, Florida, on January 19, 2000, of heart disease, aged 85. Her son Anthony Loder spread her ashes in Austria's Vienna Woods in accordance with her last wishes.

In 2014 a memorial to Lamarr was unveiled in Vienna's Central Cemetery.

Awards and tributes 
Hedy Lamarr was honored with a star on the Hollywood Walk of Fame in 1960.

In 1939, Lamarr was selected the "most promising new actress" of 1938 in a poll of area voters conducted by Philadelphia Record film critic. British moviegoers voted Hedy Lamarr the year's 10th best actress, for her performance in Samson and Delilah in 1951.

The British drag queen Foo Foo Lamarr (born Francis Pearson, 1937–2003) originally took his surname from the actress when embarking on a performing career.

In 1997, Lamarr and George Antheil were jointly honored with the Electronic Frontier Foundation's Pioneer Award and Lamarr also was the first woman to receive the Invention Convention's BULBIE Gnass Spirit of Achievement Award, known as the "Oscars of inventing". The following year, Lamarr's native Austria awarded her the Viktor Kaplan Medal of the Austrian Association of Patent Holders and Inventors.

In 2006, the Hedy-Lamarr-Weg was founded in Vienna Meidling (12th District), named after the actress.

In 2013, the IQOQI installed a quantum telescope on the roof of the University of Vienna, which they named after her in 2014.

In 2014, Lamarr was posthumously inducted into the National Inventors Hall of Fame for frequency-hopping spread spectrum technology. The same year, Anthony Loder's request that the remaining ashes of his mother should be buried in an honorary grave of the city of Vienna was realized. On November 7, her urn was buried at the Vienna Central Cemetery in Group 33 G, Tomb No. 80, not far from the centrally located presidential tomb.

On November 9, 2015, Google honored her on the 101st anniversary of her birth with a doodle.

On August 27, 2019, an asteroid was named after her: 32730 Lamarr.

Marriages and children
Lamarr was married and divorced six times and had three children:
 Friedrich Mandl (married 1933–1937), chairman of the Hirtenberger Patronen-Fabrik
 Gene Markey (married 1939–1941), screenwriter and producer. She adopted a child during her marriage with Markey. Lamarr and Markey lived at 2727 Benedict Canyon Drive in Beverly Hills, California during their marriage.
 John Loder (married 1943–1947), actor. The two had a daughter who married Larry Colton, a writer and former baseball player and a son who worked for illustrator James McMullan. Anthony Loder was featured in the 2004 documentary film Calling Hedy Lamarr.
 Ernest "Ted" Stauffer (married 1951–1952), nightclub owner, restaurateur, and former bandleader
 W. Howard Lee (married 1953–1960), a Texas oilman (who later married film actress Gene Tierney)
 Lewis J. Boies (married 1963–1965), Lamarr's divorce lawyer

Following her sixth and final divorce in 1965, Lamarr remained unmarried for the last 35 years of her life.

Throughout her life, Lamarr claimed that her first son was not biologically related and adopted during her marriage to Gene Markey. However, years later, her son found documentation that he was the out-of-wedlock son of Lamarr and actor John Loder, whom she later married as her third husband.

Filmography

Source:

Radio appearances

In popular culture
The Mel Brooks 1974 western parody Blazing Saddles features a villain named "Hedley Lamarr". As a running gag, various characters mistakenly refer to him as "Hedy Lamarr" prompting him to testily reply "That's Hedley."

In the 1982 off-Broadway musical Little Shop of Horrors and subsequent film adaptation (1986), Audrey II says to Seymour in the song "Feed Me", that he can get Seymour anything he wants including "A date with Hedy Lamarr."

In the 2004 video game Half-Life 2, Dr. Kleiner's pet headcrab, Lamarr, is named after Hedy Lamarr.

In 2008, an off-Broadway play, Frequency Hopping, features the lives of Lamarr and Antheil. The play was written and staged by Elyse Singer, and the script won a prize for best new play about science and technology from STAGE.

In the 2009 mockumentary The Chronoscope, written and directed by Andrew Legge, the fictional Irish scientist Charlotte Keppel is likely modeled after Hedy Lamarr. The film satirizes the extreme politics of the 1930s and tells the story of a fictionalized fascist group that steals a device invented by Keppel. This chronoscope can see the past and is used by the group to create propaganda films of their heroes from the past.

In 2010, Lamarr was selected out of 150 IT people to be featured in a short film launched by the British Computer Society on May 20.

Also during 2010, the New York Public Library exhibit Thirty Years of Photography at the New York Public Library included a photo of a topless Lamarr by Austrian-born American photographer Trude Fleischmann.

In 2011, the story of Lamarr's frequency-hopping spread spectrum invention was explored in an episode of the Science Channel show Dark Matters: Twisted But True, a series that explores the darker side of scientific discovery and experimentation, which premiered on September 7. Her work in improving wireless security was part of the premiere episode of the Discovery Channel show How We Invented the World.

Also during 2011, Anne Hathaway revealed that she had learned that the original Catwoman was based on Lamarr, so she studied all of Lamarr's films and incorporated some of her breathing techniques into her portrayal of Catwoman in the 2012 film The Dark Knight Rises.

In 2015, on November 9, the 101st anniversary of Lamarr's birth, Google paid tribute to Hedy Lamarr's work in film and her contributions to scientific advancement with an animated Google Doodle.

In 2016, Lamarr was depicted in an off-Broadway play, HEDY! The Life and Inventions of Hedy Lamarr, a one-woman show written and performed by Heather Massie.

In 2016, the off-Broadway, one-actor show "Stand Still and Look Stupid: The Life Story of Hedy Lamarr." starring Emily Ebertz and written by Mike Broemmel went into production.

Also during 2016, Whitney Frost, a character in the TV show Agent Carter was inspired by Hedy Lamarr and Lauren Bacall.

In 2017, actress Celia Massingham portrayed Lamarr on The CW television series Legends of Tomorrow in the sixth episode of the third season, titled Helen Hunt. The episode is set in 1937 Hollywoodland. The episode aired on November 14, 2017.

Also during 2017, Bombshell: The Hedy Lamarr Story, written and directed by Alexandra Dean and produced by Susan Sarandon, a documentary about Lamarr's career as an actress and later as an inventor, premiered at the 2017 Tribeca Film Festival. It was released in theaters on November 24, 2017, and aired on PBS American Masters in May 2018.
 
In 2018, actress Alyssa Sutherland portrayed Lamarr on the NBC television series Timeless in the third episode of the second season, titled Hollywoodland. The episode aired March 25, 2018.

In 2019, actor and musician Johnny Depp composed a song called "This Is a Song for Miss Hedy Lamarr" with Tommy Henriksen. It was included on Depp and Jeff Beck's 2022 album 18.

In 2021, Lamarr was mentioned in the first episode of the Marvel's What If...? The episode aired on August 11, 2021.

See also 

 Inventors' Day
 List of Austrians

Notes

References

Further reading

External links

 
 
 
 Hedy Lamarr Foundation website
 Hedy Lamarr profile at the National Inventors Hall of Fame
 US Patent 2292387, owned by Hedy Kiesler Markey AKA Hedy Lamarr on Google Patents
US Patent 2292387  on WIPO Pantentscope
 Profile, women-inventors.com
 Hedy Lamarr at Reel Classics
 Happy 100th Birthday Hedy Lamarr, Movie Star who Paved the Way for Wifi at CNet
 "Most Beautiful Woman" by Day, Inventor by Night at NPR
 Hedy Lamarr at Inventions
 Hedy Lamarr: Q&A with Author Patrick Agan, Andre Soares, Alt Film Guide, 
 Hedy at a Hundred the centenary of Lamarr's birth, in the Ames Tribune, November 2014
 "The unlikely life of inventor and Hollywood star Hedy Lamarr" (article and audio excerpts), Alex McClintock and Sharon Carleton, Radio National, Australian Broadcasting Corporation, July 14, 2014
 Episode 6: Hedy Lamarr from Babes of Science podcasts
Hedy Lamarr before she came to Hollywood and Hedy Lamarr – brains, beauty and bad judgment at aenigma

1914 births
2000 deaths
20th-century American actresses
20th-century Austrian actresses
20th-century Austrian people
Actresses from Vienna
American anti-fascists
American film actresses
American people of Hungarian-Jewish descent
American people of Austrian-Jewish descent
Austrian emigrants to the United States
Austro-Hungarian Jews
Austrian film actresses
Austrian inventors
Illeists
Jewish American actresses
Metro-Goldwyn-Mayer contract players
People with acquired American citizenship
Radio pioneers
Women inventors
20th-century American inventors